The Tamarack River may refer to a water body in the United States:

 Tamarack River (Michigan), a tributary of the Middle Branch Ontonagon River in Iron and Gogebic counties on the Upper Peninsula of Michigan
 Tamarack River (Minnesota), a tributary of the Prairie River in Aitkin and Carlton counties on Minnesota
 Little Tamarack River, a tributary of the Tamarack River in Minnesota
 Lower Tamarack River, a tributary of the St. Croix River in Pine County, Minnesota
 Upper Tamarack River, a tributary of the St. Croix River in Pine County, Minnesota

See also
 Tamarac River (disambiguation)
 Tamarack (disambiguation)